Triumph is a board game published in 1986 by Creative Crusade Ltd.

Contents
Triumph is a game in which two to four players use tetrahedral pieces on a folding hexagon-shaped board.

Reception
Eric Solomon reviewed Triumph for Games International magazine, and gave it 3 stars out of 5, and stated that "If you have a yen to play hexagonal Draughts, buy Triumph, but if you have a yen to take a great leap forward buy something else."

References

Board games introduced in 1986